Events from the year 1724 in France.

Incumbents 
Monarch: Louis XV

Events
 The Rémy Martin cognac house is established.

Births
 July 31 – Noël François de Wailly, French lexicographer (d. 1801)
 October 16 – Joseph Alphonse de Véri, abbot (d. 1799)
 December 30 – Louis-Jean-François Lagrenée, French painter (d. 1805)

Deaths
 

 October 2 – François-Timoléon de Choisy, French writer (b. 1644)

See also

References

1720s in France